This page shows the results of the Karate Competition for men and women at the 1999 Pan American Games, held from July 23 to August 8, 1999 in Winnipeg, Manitoba, Canada.

Men's competition

Kata

Kumite (– 60 kg)

Kumite (– 65 kg)

Kumite (– 70 kg)

Kumite (– 75 kg)

Kumite (– 80 kg)

Kumite (+ 80 kg)

Women's competition

Kata

Kumite (– 53 kg)

Kumite (– 60 kg)

Kumite (+ 60 kg)

Medal table

References
 Sports 123

P
1999
Events at the 1999 Pan American Games